Ole Paulssøn Haagenstad (17 October 1775 – 16 April 1866) was a Norwegian farmer and politician.

Haagenstad was born at the Harildstad farm in  the parish of Fron (now Nord-Fron) in Oppland, Norway.

He was elected to the Norwegian Parliament in 1814, 1815, 1818, 1824, 1827, 1833, 1836, 1839 and 1842, representing the rural constituency of Christians Amt (today named Oppland).

References

1775 births
1866 deaths
Members of the Storting
Oppland politicians
Norwegian farmers
People from Nord-Fron